The name Glenrothes refers to:

 Glenrothes, Fife, one of Scotland's new towns
 Glenrothes (UK Parliament constituency), a constituency represented in the British House of Commons
 The Glenrothes, a single malt whisky